The national emblem of the Azerbaijan Soviet Socialist Republic was adopted in 1937 by the government of the Azerbaijan Soviet Socialist Republic. The style is based on the emblem of the Soviet Union.

The emblem features a drilling rig representing Baku's abundant oil reservoirs and, behind it, a sunrise, representing the future of the Azeri nation. The hammer and sickle are prominently featured above it while the red star (symbolizing "socialism on all five continents") sits at the top of the emblem, for the victory of Communism and the "world-wide socialist community of states". The outer rim features symbols of agriculture – wheat and cotton.

The slogan on the banner bears the Soviet Union state motto ("Workers of the world, unite!") in both the Russian and Azerbaijani languages. In Azerbaijani, it is "Бүтүн өлкəлəрин пролетарлары, бирлəшин!" (in the current Azerbaijani Latin script: "Bütün ölkələrin proletarları, birləşin!").

The full name of the Azerbaijan Soviet Socialist Republic is spelled out in both in the Russian and Azeri languages.

The present emblem was used from 1918 later restored in 1992 prior to independence.

History

Early emblems of the Azerbaijan SSR
On the first banknotes of the Azerbaijan SSR, issued in 1920, there appeared a composition consisting of a crossed sickle and hammer, a 5-terminal star and a crescent moon, which often consisted of a wreath of ears.

The same composition was included in the Order of the Red Banner of the Azerbaijan SSR, approved in 1920, the draft of which was developed by the head of the military topographical department of the operational mobilization department of the staff of the People's Commissar for Military and Naval Affairs of the AzSSR, I.P. Vekilov, in the image and likeness of the Order of Red Banner of the RSFSR.

This composition was fixed in the Constitution of the Azerbaijan Socialist Soviet Republic adopted on 19 May 1921 by the First Congress of Soviets of Azerbaijan, which established the description of the coat of arms, copied from the description of the emblem of the RSFSR in its Constitution of 1918, article 103:

Apparently, there was no consensus about the depiction on the exact image of the emblem. Various compositions were created instead. The most popular one includes a sickle, a hammer, a crescent, and a 5-pointed star, most often in a wreath of ears, and the inscriptions were written with a Turkic or Tatar language, and written with Arabic letters.

In particular, such composition was depicted on all postage stamps of the Azerbaijan SSR, which were in circulation since 1 October 1921. The author of the drawings was the Baku satirist Beno (Benedikt) Rafailovich Telingater.

After 13 December 1922, the CEC of the Azerbaijan SSR became part of the Transcaucasian SFSR, which formed on 30 December 1922, and together with the RSFSR, the Ukrainian SSR and the Byelorussian SSR became the USSR. The usage of the composition for symbolizing the Azerbaijani SSR reduced, due to being replaced by the emblem of USSR and Transcaucasian SFSR.

Transition to Latin alphabet
On 30 December 1922, the Central Executive Committee of the Azerbaijani SSR adopted a decree on the equality of the Latin alphabet with the Arabic letters. The change was reflected in the description of the emblem in the new Constitution of the Azerbaijani SSR adopted on 8 December 1924, which was approved on 14 March 1925. On the new constitution, the words "in the new and old alphabets" were added to the description of the emblem.

First emblem
In the second revision of the new Constitution of Azerbaijan (approved by the All-Azerbaijan Congress of Soviets on 26 March 1927), the coat of arms is described as follows:

After this revision, the official versions of the emblems had appeared.

On 1 January 1929, by the resolution of the CEC of the Azerbaijani SSR, the Latin alphabet was declared the official script of Azerbaijan SSR. This resulted in the words "and the old" were removed from the description of the emblem in the Constitution of the Azerbaijan SSR.

Second emblem 
Since 1930, in the emblem of the Azerbaijan SSR, the inscriptions were written only using the Latin alphabet. This was fixed in the new version of the Constitution of the Azerbaijani SSR, which was adopted on 14 February 1931 by the VII All-Azerbaijan Congress of Soviets, which established a new description of the coat of arms of the Azerbaijan SSR. The description was as following:

The official design of the emblem was created by theatrical artist Benedikt (Beno) Rafailovich Telingater (1876-1960), who had created the previous unofficial version of the coat of arms of the Azerbaijan SSR.

Third emblem 
After the creation of the new constitution of the USSR in 1936, Azerbaijan SSR also sought to create a new constitution. The new Constitution of the Azerbaijani SSR, adopted by the Extraordinary IX All-Azerbaijan Congress of Soviets on 14 March 1937, established a description of the new state emblem of the Azerbaijan SSR:

The official design of the emblem was created by the graphic artist Ruben Arkadevich.

First revision 

The words on the emblem were changed at the end of 1937, in order to distance the emblem from the Turkish language. On the coat of arms, the word "SYRA" (soviet) was replaced by "SOVET", and the word "CYMHYRIJJƏTI" (republic) was replaced by "RESPUBLIQASЬ". This shift in wording was not exclusive to the emblem, and was implemented within the Azerbaijani language itself, and the changed wording remained the standard of the language thereafter.

Second revision
In accordance with the Law of the Azerbaijan SSR "On the Shift of Azerbaijani Letters from the Latin to the Russian Alphabet" adopted on 11 July 1939, the letters of the Azerbaijani language on 1 January 1940 was shifted from the Latin alphabet into the Cyrillic alphabet (adjusted according to the Azeri language). By the decree of the Presidium of the Supreme Soviet of the Azerbaijan SSR of 20 March 1940, inscriptions on the state emblem of the Azerbaijan SSR were depicted in Cyrillic letters.

On 5 May 1956, the Decree of the Presidium of the Supreme Soviet of the Azerbaijan SSR approved the "Regulations on the State Emblem of the Azerbaijan Soviet Socialist Republic", which established a more accurate depiction, including a light red circle, against which the elements of the coat of arms were depicted (in the constitutional description, there was no mention of this background).

Third revision
On 21 April 1978, the new Constitution (Basic Law) of the Azerbaijani SSR was adopted, the description of the state emblem in which remained unchanged, but in the graphic annex to the "Regulations on the State Emblem of the Azerbaijan Soviet Socialist Republic", the sun's rays were depicted somewhat less often, and the shade of the pink circle is lighter than in the figure in the 1956 Statute.

Gallery

References

External links

Presidential Library of Azerbaijan
A document about the emblem of Azerbaijan and the Azerbaijan SSR. 
A document about the emblem of Azerbaijan and the Azerbaijan SSR (in Azerbaijani) - The document contains an article about the coat of arms of the Azerbaijani SSR in constitutions and decrees.
The Constitution of Azerbaijan and the Azerbaijan SSR (in Azerbaijani) - The constitution contains the description of the historical coats of arms of the Azerbaijan Soviet Socialist Republic.
The Constitution of Azerbaijan and the highlights of the constitutions of the Azerbaijan SSR.

Azerbaijan SSR
National symbols of Azerbaijan
Azerbaijan Soviet Socialist Republic
Azerbaijan Soviet Socialist Republic
Azerbaijan SSR
Azerbaijan SSR
Azerbaijan SSR
Azerbaijan SSR
Azerbaijan SSR
Azerbaijan SSR
Azerbaijan SFSR